Posht Mekh (also Romanized as Posht Makh; also known as Pushtamah and Pushtamikh) is a village in Gurab Zarmikh Rural District, Mirza Kuchek Janghli District, Sowme'eh Sara County, Gilan Province, Iran. At the 2006 census, its population was 703, in 199 families.

References 

Populated places in Sowme'eh Sara County